Ethan Allen Hitchcock (September 19, 1835 – April 9, 1909) served under Presidents William McKinley and Theodore Roosevelt as U.S. Secretary of the Interior.

Business career
Hitchcock was born on September 19, 1835, in Mobile, Alabama, the son of Henry Hitchcock (1791–1839), a justice on the Alabama Supreme Court, and Anne Erwin Hitchcock.  He was the brother of Henry Hitchcock, nephew of Major General Ethan Allen Hitchcock, grandson of Judge Samuel Hitchcock, and great-grandson of Ethan Allen.

He was in mercantile business at Saint Louis, Missouri, 1855–60, then went to China to enter a commission house, of which firm he became a partner in 1866. He was married to Margaret Dwight Collier on March 20, 1869. Ethan and Margaret Hitchcock had three daughters, Sarah, Anne and Margaret Hitchcock.

In 1872 he retired from business, in 1874 returned to the United States, and in 1874-97 was president of several manufacturing, mining and railway companies.

He was a member of the Missouri Society of the Sons of the Revolution.

Government career
Hitchcock was in his sixties when President McKinley appointed him Envoy Extraordinary and Minister Plenipotentiary to Russia in 1897 and in February 1898 Ambassador Extraordinary and Minister Plenipotentiary, the first Ambassador accredited from the United States to the court of Russia. He was recalled in 1898 to serve in first McKinley's and then his successor, Roosevelt's, Cabinet.  As Secretary of the Interior, Hitchcock pursued a vigorous program for the conservation of natural resources and reorganized the administration of Native American affairs.

Hitchcock died April 9, 1909, in Washington, D.C., at the age of 73. Hitchcock was buried at the Bellefontaine Cemetery in St. Louis, Missouri.

References

External links

New York Times article on Hitchcock's appointment as Interior Secretary December 22, 1898.

1835 births
1909 deaths
19th-century American businesspeople
19th-century American diplomats
19th-century American politicians
Alabama Republicans
Ambassadors of the United States to Russia
American expatriates in China
Burials at Bellefontaine Cemetery
Businesspeople from St. Louis
McKinley administration cabinet members
Missouri Republicans
Politicians from Mobile, Alabama
Theodore Roosevelt administration cabinet members
United States Secretaries of the Interior